Ruqia Hina is a Pakistani politician who has been a Member of the Provincial Assembly of Khyber Pakhtunkhwa, since May 2013.

Education
Hina has completed matriculation education.

Political career

Hina was elected to the Provincial Assembly of Khyber Pakhtunkhwa as a candidate of Pakistan Muslim League (N) on a reserved seat for women in 2013 Pakistani general election.

In May 2016, she joined a resolution to establish a Women's Caucus in the Provincial Assembly of Khyber Pakhtunkhwa. She also joined a resolution to declare 8 July as Charity Day in honour of Abdul Sattar Edhi.

References

Living people
Pakistan Muslim League (N) politicians
Year of birth missing (living people)